Maggie Connor (born September 1, 1963) is an American freestyle skier. She competed in the women's moguls event at the 1992 Winter Olympics.

References

External links
 

1963 births
Living people
American female freestyle skiers
Olympic freestyle skiers of the United States
Freestyle skiers at the 1992 Winter Olympics
Sportspeople from Salem, Massachusetts
21st-century American women